Abul Fayez Muhammad Khalid Hossain (born 2 February 1959), popularly known as Dr. A F M Khalid Hossain, is a Bangladeshi Deobandi Islamic scholar, educator, writer, researcher, editor, international Islamic speaker and social reformer. He is the Former Vice-president of Hefazat-e-Islam Bangladesh, Education Adviser of Islami Andolan Bangladesh, editor of monthly At-Tawheed and assistant editor of Balagh al-Sharq. He was the Professor and Head of Department of Islamic History and Culture at Omargani MES College and Central President of the Islami Chhatra Samaj, student wing of Nizam-e-Islam Party. He has published more than two hundred research articles in various journals, including The World Muslim League Journal. He has edited 3 to 9 volumes of the second edition of Islami Bishwakosh and Sirat encyclopedia, published by Islamic Foundation Bangladesh.

Name and lineage
Hossain was born on 2 February 1959 into a Bengali Muslim family in Madarsha Union, Satkania Upazila under Chittagong District. His father Muhammad Habibullah was an Islamic scholar.

Education
He started his education by enrolling in Babunagar Government Primary School and studied till class 3. From 1969 to 1971 he studied at Al Jamia Al Islamia Patiya. He passed Alim in 1971 and Fazil in 1973 with first class from Satkania Mahmudul Uloom Alia Madrasa. From 1973 to 1975 he studied Hadith at Chittagong Chandanpura Darul Uloom. He passed Kamil from Bangladesh Madrasah Education Board in 1975.

In 1982 he gained a BA (Hons) degree from the Department of Islamic History and Culture at University of Chittagong and in 1983 he gained an MA degree in the same subject. He completed his PhD in 2006 with a scholarship from the University of Chittagong on ‘The Sermons of the Prophet Muhammad saw. : A socio-cultural Study’. Among his teachers are Abdul Halim Bukhari etc.

Career
He started his career in 1987 as a lecturer in Arabic language and literature at Satkania Alia Mahmudul Uloom Fazil Madrasa.  From 1992 to January 2019, he was a Professor and Head of the Department of Islamic History and Culture at Omargani MES College, Chittagong. Since 2007, he has been the editor of Al Jamia Al Islamia Patiya's religious and literary journal monthly At-Tawheed and  Khatib of Hazrat Uthman (ra) Jame Mosque in A-Block, Halishahar.

He was also a part-time professor at Asian University of Bangladesh for one and a half years. During Harun Islamabad's tenure, he was teaching for four years in the Department of Bangla Language and Literature at Al Jamia Al Islamia Patiya and one year as a teacher at Osilatul Ilam at Jamia Darul Ma'arif Al-Islamia at the invitation of Sultan Zauq Nadvi. During his student life (1973-1984) he was the correspondent of Dainik Sangbad, Dainik Banglar Bani, The Bangladesh Times and the university reporter of The New Nation.

On 15 November 2020, he was elected vice-president of Hefazat-e-Islam Bangladesh.

Publications
His first article "The Life and Work of Hazrat Umar Farooq (RA)" was published by monthly At-Tawheed. Currently, he is the editor of monthly At-Tawheed and assistant editor of the Arabic magazine Balag al-Sharq, regular writer at four national newspapers. He has edited 3 to 9 volumes of the second edition of Islami Bishwakosh and Sirat encyclopedia published by Islamic Foundation Bangladesh. 
Books
 Maslak-e Ulama-e-Deoband (translation)
 Contribution of Muslims in India (translation)
 Karwan-e Zindegi - Volume 3 (translation)
 Khatib-e-Azam Maulana Siddique Ahmad: The Source of a Revolution (1989)
 Selected Essays-1 etc.
Edited
 Sirat-e Ayesha (Ra.)
 Rise of global Islam
 Aso Nari Porda Kori
 Prayers for men and women 

He is also a member of the committee for verification of authenticity and purity of Zulfiqar Ahmad Naqshbandi's book translated into Bengali.

See more
Shah Ahmad Shafi
Junaid Babunagari
Muhibbullah Babunagari
Abdul Halim Bukhari
Nur Hossain Kasemi
Nurul Islam Jihadi
Mahmudul Hasan
Mamunul Haque

References

External links

1959 births
Al Jamia Al Islamia Patiya alumni
Bangladeshi editors
Bangladeshi Islamic religious leaders
Bangladeshi Sunni Muslim scholars of Islam
Bengali Muslim scholars of Islam
Deobandis
Hanafis
Living people
People from Satkania Upazila
Sunni Muslim scholars of Islam
University of Chittagong alumni
20th-century Muslim scholars of Islam
21st-century Bangladeshi writers